Claude Bramall Burgess,  (Chinese: 白嘉時, 25 February 1910 – 2 November 1998), was the Colonial Secretary of Hong Kong from 1958 to 1963.

From 1939 to 1941, He was the Deputy Clerk of the Legislative Council of Hong Kong and he became the Acting Clerk of the Legislative Council at 1946. 

Chief Secretaries of Hong Kong
Companions of the Order of St Michael and St George
Officers of the Order of the British Empire
1910 births
1998 deaths
People from Cheshire West and Chester